Barbara Mettler (born 30 June, 1971) is a Swiss former cross-country skier who competed from 1991 to 1998. Competing in two Winter Olympics, she earned her best finishes at Lillehammer in 1994 with a fifth in the 4 × 5 km relay overall and a 23rd in the 5 km + 10 km combined pursuit individually, respectively.

Mettler's best finish at the FIS Nordic World Ski Championships was 16th in the 30 km at Falun in 1993. Her best World Cup finish was eighth in a 15 km event in Canada in 1991.

Mettler's lone career victory was in a 10 km FIS race in Switzerland in 1996.

Cross-country skiing results
All results are sourced from the International Ski Federation (FIS).

Olympic Games

World Championships

World Cup

Season standings

References

External links

Women's 4 x 5 km cross-country relay Olympic results: 1976-2002 

1971 births
Cross-country skiers at the 1992 Winter Olympics
Cross-country skiers at the 1994 Winter Olympics
Living people
Swiss female cross-country skiers
Olympic cross-country skiers of Switzerland
20th-century Swiss women